Sir Christopher Puller (1774 – 26 May 1824) was an English lawyer who was briefly Chief Justice of Bengal.

Life
He was born the son of London merchant Richard Puller and educated at Eton and Christ Church, Oxford, where he graduated B.A. in 1795, and was elected a fellow of Oriel College. He studied law at the Inner Temple and was called to the bar in 1800. He then moved in 1812 to Lincoln's Inn, where he was elected a bencher in 1822.

He appeared for the prosecution in the 1812 trial of William Booth for forgery. Booth was sentenced to hang.

In his early career Puller worked as a law reporter with Sir Justice John Bernard Bosanquet. In 1823 he accepted the post of Chief Justice at the Supreme Court of Judicature at Fort William, Calcutta and received the customary knighthood. However, like his predecessor Sir Robert Henry Blosset, he died there within a few months of starting his judicial duties.

He was buried in St John's Churchyard, Calcutta.

Family
Puller married Louisa King (1772–1857), daughter of Joseph King of Taplow, and niece of Daniel Giles of Youngsbury, Hertfordshire.

References

Attribution

1774 births
1824 deaths
People educated at Eton College
Alumni of Christ Church, Oxford
Members of the Inner Temple
Members of Lincoln's Inn
British India judges
Knights Bachelor